John Edgar Hoover (January 1, 1895 – May 2, 1972) was an American law-enforcement administrator who served as the first Director of the Federal Bureau of Investigation (FBI). Calvin Coolidge appointed Hoover as director of the Bureau of Investigation—the FBI's predecessor—in 1924, and in 1935 Hoover became instrumental in founding the FBI, where he remained director for 37 years until his death in 1972. Hoover expanded the FBI into a larger crime-fighting agency and instituted a number of modernizations to policing technology, such as a centralized fingerprint file and forensic laboratories. Hoover also established and expanded a national blacklist, referred to as the FBI Index or Index List.

Later in life and after his death, Hoover became a controversial figure as evidence of his secretive abuses of power began to surface. He was found to have routinely violated both the FBI's own policies and the very laws which the FBI was charged with enforcing, to have used the FBI to harass and sabotage political dissidents, to amass secret files for blackmailing high-level politicians, and to have collected evidence using illegal surveillance, wiretapping, and burglaries. Hoover consequently amassed a great deal of power and was able to intimidate and threaten political figures.

Early life and education

John Edgar Hoover was born on New Year's Day 1895 in Washington, D.C., to Anna Marie (née Scheitlin; 1860–1938) and Dickerson Naylor Hoover (1856–1921), chief of the printing division of the U.S. Coast and Geodetic Survey, formerly a plate maker for the same organization. Dickerson Hoover was of English and German ancestry. Hoover's maternal great-uncle, John Hitz, was a Swiss honorary consul general to the United States. Among his family, he was the closest to his mother, who was their moral guide and disciplinarian.

Hoover was born in a house on the present site of Capitol Hill United Methodist Church, located on Seward Square near Eastern Market in Washington's Capitol Hill neighborhood. A stained glass window in the church is dedicated to him. Hoover did not have a birth certificate filed upon his birth, although it was required in 1895 in Washington. Two of his siblings did have certificates, but Hoover's was not filed until 1938 when he was 43.

Hoover lived his entire life in Washington, D.C. He attended Central High School, where he sang in the school choir, participated in the Reserve Officers' Training Corps program, and competed on the debate team. During debates, he argued against women getting the right to vote and against the abolition of the death penalty. The school newspaper applauded his "cool, relentless logic." Hoover stuttered as a boy, which he later learned to manage by teaching himself to talk quickly—a style that he carried through his adult career. He eventually spoke with such ferocious speed that stenographers had a hard time following him.

Hoover was 18 years old when he accepted his first job, an entry-level position as messenger in the orders department at the Library of Congress. The library was a half mile from his house. The experience shaped both Hoover and the creation of the FBI profiles; as Hoover noted in a 1951 letter: "This job ... trained me in the value of collating material. It gave me an excellent foundation for my work in the FBI where it has been necessary to collate information and evidence."

Hoover obtained a Bachelor of Laws from the George Washington University Law School in 1916, where he was a member of the Alpha Nu Chapter of the Kappa Alpha Order, and an LL.M. in 1917 from the same university. While a law student, Hoover became interested in the career of Anthony Comstock, the New York City U.S. Postal Inspector, who waged prolonged campaigns against fraud, vice, pornography, and birth control.

Department of Justice

War Emergency Division
Immediately after getting his LL.M. degree, Hoover was hired by the Justice Department to work in the War Emergency Division. He accepted the clerkship on July 27, 1917, aged 22. The job paid $990 a year ($ in  dollars) and was exempt from the draft.

He soon became the head of the Division's Alien Enemy Bureau, authorized by President Woodrow Wilson at the beginning of World War I to arrest and jail allegedly disloyal foreigners without trial. He received additional authority from the 1917 Espionage Act. Out of a list of 1,400 suspicious Germans living in the U.S., the Bureau arrested 98 and designated 1,172 as arrestable.

Bureau of Investigation

Head of the Radical Division
In August 1919, the 24-year-old Hoover became head of the Bureau of Investigation's new General Intelligence Division, also known as the Radical Division because its goal was to monitor and disrupt the work of domestic radicals. America's First Red Scare was beginning, and one of Hoover's first assignments was to carry out the Palmer Raids.

Hoover and his chosen assistant, George Ruch, monitored a variety of U.S. radicals with the intent to punish, arrest, or deport those whose politics they decided were dangerous. Targets during this period included Marcus Garvey; Rose Pastor Stokes and Cyril Briggs; Emma Goldman and Alexander Berkman; and future Supreme Court justice Felix Frankfurter, who, Hoover maintained, was "the most dangerous man in the United States."

In 1920 the 25 year-old Edgar Hoover was initiated as a Freemason at D.C.'s Federal Lodge No. 1 in Washington D.C. He went on to join the Scottish Rite in which he was made a 33rd Degree Inspector General Honorary in 1955.

Head of the Bureau of Investigation
In 1921, Hoover rose in the Bureau of Investigation to deputy head, and in 1924 the Attorney General made him the acting director. On May 10, 1924, President Calvin Coolidge appointed Hoover as the fifth Director of the Bureau of Investigation, partly in response to allegations that the prior director, William J. Burns, was involved in the Teapot Dome scandal. When Hoover took over the Bureau of Investigation, it had approximately 650 employees, including 441 Special Agents.
Hoover fired all female agents and banned the future hiring of them.
Hoover was sometimes unpredictable in his leadership. He frequently fired Bureau agents, singling out those he thought "looked stupid like truck drivers," or whom he considered "pinheads." He also relocated agents who had displeased him to career-ending assignments and locations. Melvin Purvis was a prime example: Purvis was one of the most effective agents in capturing and breaking up 1930s gangs, and it is alleged that Hoover maneuvered him out of the Bureau because he was envious of the substantial public recognition Purvis received.

Hoover often praised local law-enforcement officers around the country, and built up a national network of supporters and admirers in the process. One whom he often commended for particular effectiveness was the conservative sheriff of Caddo Parish, Louisiana, J. Howell Flournoy.

In December 1929, Hoover oversaw the protection detail for the Japanese Naval Delegation who were visiting Washington, D.C., on their way to attend negotiations for the 1930 London Naval Treaty (officially called Treaty for the Limitation and Reduction of Naval Armament). The Japanese delegation was greeted at Washington Union (train) Station by U.S. Secretary of State Henry L. Stimson and the Japanese Ambassador Katsuji Debuchi. The Japanese delegation then visited the White House to meet with President Herbert Hoover.

Depression-era gangsters

In the early 1930s, criminal gangs carried out large numbers of bank robberies in the Midwest. They used their superior firepower and fast getaway cars to elude local law enforcement agencies and avoid arrest. Many of these criminals frequently made newspaper headlines across the United States, particularly John Dillinger, who became famous for leaping over bank cages, and repeatedly escaping from jails and police traps. The gangsters enjoyed a level of sympathy in the Midwest, as banks and bankers were widely seen as oppressors of common people during the Great Depression.

The robbers operated across state lines, and Hoover pressed to have their crimes recognized as federal offenses so that he and his men would have the authority to pursue them and get the credit for capturing them. Initially, the Bureau suffered some embarrassing foul-ups, in particular with Dillinger and his conspirators. A raid on a summer lodge in Manitowish Waters, Wisconsin, called "Little Bohemia," left a Bureau agent and a civilian bystander dead and others wounded; all the gangsters escaped.

Hoover realized that his job was then on the line, and he pulled out all stops to capture the culprits. In late July 1934, Special Agent Melvin Purvis, the Director of Operations in the Chicago office, received a tip on Dillinger's whereabouts that paid off when Dillinger was located, ambushed, and killed by Bureau agents outside the Biograph Theater.

Hoover was credited for overseeing several highly publicized captures or shootings of outlaws and bank robbers. These included those of Machine Gun Kelly in 1933, of Dillinger in 1934, and of Alvin Karpis in 1936, which led to the Bureau's powers being broadened.

In 1935, the Bureau of Investigation was renamed the Federal Bureau of Investigation (FBI). It was not simply a name change. A great deal of restructuring was done. In fact, Hoover visited the lab of Canadian forensic scientist Wilfrid Derome twice - in 1929 and 1932 - to plan the foundation of his own FBI laboratory in the USA. It was the insight gained from these visits which helped him transform the BI into FBI in 1935.

In 1939, the FBI became pre-eminent in domestic intelligence, thanks in large part to changes made by Hoover, such as expanding and combining fingerprint files in the Identification Division, to compiling the largest collection of fingerprints to date, and Hoover's help to expand the FBI's recruitment and create the FBI Laboratory, a division established in 1932 to examine and analyze evidence found by the FBI.

American Mafia
During the 1930s, Hoover persistently denied the existence of organized crime, despite numerous gangland shootings as Mafia groups struggled for control of the lucrative profits deriving from illegal alcohol sales during Prohibition, and later for control of prostitution, illegal drugs and other criminal enterprises.

 
Many writers believe Hoover's denial of the Mafia's existence and his failure to use the full force of the FBI to investigate it were due to Mafia gangsters Meyer Lansky and Frank Costello's possession of embarrassing photographs of Hoover in the company of his protégé, FBI Deputy Director Clyde Tolson. Other writers believe Costello corrupted Hoover by providing him with horseracing tips, passed through a mutual friend, gossip columnist Walter Winchell.  Hoover had a reputation as "an inveterate horseplayer", and was known to send Special Agents to place $100 bets for him. Hoover once said the Bureau had "much more important functions" than arresting bookmakers and gamblers.

Although Hoover built the reputation of the FBI arresting bank robbers in the 1930s, his main interest had always been Communist subversion, and during the Cold War he was able to focus the FBI's attention on these investigations.  From the mid-1940s through the mid-50s, he paid little attention to criminal vice rackets such as illegal drugs, prostitution, extortion, and flatly denied the existence of the Mafia in the United States. In the 1950s, evidence of the FBI's unwillingness to investigate the Mafia became a topic of public criticism. After the Apalachin meeting of crime bosses in 1957, Hoover could no longer deny the existence of a nationwide crime syndicate. In fact, Cosa Nostra's control of the Syndicate's many branches operating criminal activities throughout North America prevailed and was heavily reported in popular newspapers and magazines.  Hoover created the "Top Hoodlum Program" and went after the syndicate's top bosses throughout the country.

Investigation of subversion and radicals

Hoover was concerned about what he claimed was subversion, and under his leadership, the FBI investigated tens of thousands of suspected subversives and radicals. According to critics, Hoover tended to exaggerate the dangers of these alleged subversives and many times overstepped his bounds in his pursuit of eliminating that perceived threat. William G. Hundley, a Justice Department prosecutor, joked that Hoover's investigations had actually helped the American communist movement survive, as Hoover's "informants were nearly the only ones that paid the party dues." Due to the FBI's aggressive targeting, by 1957 CPUSA membership had dwindled to less than 10,000, of whom some 1,500 were informants for the FBI.

Florida and Long Island U-boat landings

The FBI investigated rings of  German saboteurs and spies starting in the late 1930s, and had primary responsibility for counter-espionage. The first arrests of German agents were made in 1938 and continued throughout World War II. In the Quirin affair, during World War II, German U-boats set two small groups of Nazi agents ashore in Florida and on Long Island to cause acts of sabotage within the country. The two teams were apprehended after one of the agents contacted the FBI and told them everything – he was also charged, and convicted.

Illegal wire-tapping
During this time period President Franklin D. Roosevelt, out of concern over Nazi agents in the United States, gave "qualified permission" to wiretap persons "suspected ... [of] subversive activities". He went on to add, in 1941, that the United States Attorney General had to be informed of its use in each case.

The Attorney General Robert H. Jackson left it to Hoover to decide how and when to use wiretaps, as he found the "whole business" distasteful. Jackson's successor at the post of Attorney General, Francis Biddle, did turn down Hoover's requests on occasion.

Concealed espionage discoveries
In the late 1930s, President Franklin D. Roosevelt gave Hoover the task to investigate both foreign espionage in the United States and the activities of domestic communists and fascists. When the Cold War began in the late 1940s, the FBI under Hoover undertook the intensive surveillance of communists and other left-wing activists in the United States.

The FBI also participated in the Venona project, a pre-World War II joint project with the British to eavesdrop on Soviet spies in the UK and the United States. They did not initially realize that espionage was being committed, but the Soviets' multiple use of one-time pad ciphers (which with single use are unbreakable) created redundancies that allowed some intercepts to be decoded. These established that espionage was being carried out.

Hoover kept the intercepts – America's greatest counterintelligence secret – in a locked safe in his office. He chose not to inform President Truman, Attorney General J. Howard McGrath, or Secretaries of State Dean Acheson and General George Marshall while they held office. He informed the Central Intelligence Agency (CIA) of the Venona Project in 1952.

Plans for expanding the FBI to do global intelligence
After World War II, Hoover advanced plans to create a "World-Wide Intelligence Service". These plans were shot down by the Truman administration. Truman objected to the plan, emerging bureaucratic competitors opposed the centralization of power inherent in the plans, and there was a considerable aversion to creating an American version of the "Gestapo."

Plans for suspending habeas corpus
In 1946, Attorney General Tom C. Clark authorized Hoover to compile a list of potentially disloyal Americans who might be detained during a wartime national emergency. In 1950, at the outbreak of the Korean War, Hoover submitted a plan to President Truman to suspend the writ of habeas corpus and detain 12,000 Americans suspected of disloyalty. Truman did not act on the plan.

COINTELPRO and the 1950s

In 1956, Hoover was becoming increasingly frustrated by U.S. Supreme Court decisions that limited the Justice Department's ability to prosecute people for their political opinions, most notably communists. Some of his aides reported that he purposely exaggerated the threat of communism to "ensure financial and public support for the FBI." At this time he formalized a covert "dirty tricks" program under the name COINTELPRO. COINTELPRO was first used to disrupt the Communist Party USA, where Hoover ordered observation and pursuit of targets that ranged from suspected citizen spies to larger celebrity figures, such as Charlie Chaplin, whom he saw as spreading Communist Party propaganda.

COINTELPRO's methods included infiltration, burglaries, setting up illegal wiretaps, planting forged documents, and spreading false rumors about key members of target organizations. Some authors have charged that COINTELPRO methods also included inciting violence and arranging murders.

This program remained in place until it was exposed to the public in 1971, after the burglary by a group of eight activists of many internal documents from an office in Media, Pennsylvania, whereupon COINTELPRO became the cause of some of the harshest criticism of Hoover and the FBI. COINTELPRO's activities were investigated in 1975 by the United States Senate Select Committee to Study Governmental Operations with Respect to Intelligence Activities, called the "Church Committee" after its chairman, Senator Frank Church (D-Idaho); the committee declared COINTELPRO's activities were illegal and contrary to the Constitution.

Hoover amassed significant power by collecting files containing large amounts of compromising and potentially embarrassing information on many powerful people, especially politicians. According to Laurence Silberman, appointed Deputy Attorney General in early 1974, FBI Director Clarence M. Kelley thought such files either did not exist or had been destroyed. After The Washington Post broke a story in January 1975, Kelley searched and found them in his outer office.  The House Judiciary Committee then demanded that Silberman testify about them.

Reaction to civil rights groups

In 1956, several years before he targeted Martin Luther King Jr., Hoover had a public showdown with T. R. M. Howard, a civil rights leader from Mound Bayou, Mississippi. During a national speaking tour, Howard had criticized the FBI's failure to investigate thoroughly the racially motivated murders of George W. Lee, Lamar Smith, and Emmett Till. Hoover wrote an open letter to the press singling out these statements as "irresponsible."

In the 1960s, Hoover's FBI monitored John Lennon, Malcolm X, and Muhammad Ali. The COINTELPRO tactics were later extended to organizations such as the Nation of Islam, the Black Panther Party, King's Southern Christian Leadership Conference and others. Hoover's moves against people who maintained contacts with subversive elements, some of whom were members of the civil rights movement, also led to accusations of trying to undermine their reputations.

The treatment of Martin Luther King Jr. and actress Jean Seberg are two examples: Jacqueline Kennedy recalled that Hoover told President John F. Kennedy that King had tried to arrange a sex party while in the capital for the March on Washington and that Hoover told Robert F. Kennedy that King had made derogatory comments during the President's funeral. Under Hoover's leadership, the FBI sent an anonymous blackmail letter to King in 1964, urging him to commit suicide.

King's aide Andrew Young claimed in a 2013 interview with the Academy of Achievement that the main source of tension between the SCLC and FBI was the government agency's lack of black agents, and that both parties were willing to co-operate with each other by the time the Selma to Montgomery marches had taken place.

In one 1965 incident, white civil rights worker Viola Liuzzo was murdered by Ku Klux Klansmen, who had given chase and fired shots into her car after noticing that her passenger was a young black man; one of the Klansmen was Gary Thomas Rowe, an acknowledged FBI informant. The FBI spread rumors that Liuzzo was a member of the Communist Party and had abandoned her children to have sexual relationships with African Americans involved in the civil rights movement. FBI records show that Hoover personally communicated these insinuations to President Lyndon B. Johnson.

Hoover also personally ordered to cease the Federal inquiry into the 1963 16th Street Baptist Church bombing by members of the Ku Klux Klan that killed four girls. By May 1965, local investigators and the FBI had identified suspects in the bombing and witnesses, and this information was relayed to Hoover. No prosecutions of the four suspects ensued, however, even though the evidence was reportedly "so strong that even a white Alabama jury would convict". There had been a history of mistrust between local and federal investigators. Hoover wrote in a memo that the chances of a conviction were remote and told his agents not to share their results with federal or state prosecutors. In 1968, the FBI formally closed their investigation into the bombing without filing charges against any of their named suspects. The files were sealed by order of Hoover.

Hoover in 1970 personally authorized "black-bag" jobs against the Weather Underground per testimony from William C. Sullivan.

Late career and death
One of his biographers, Kenneth Ackerman, wrote that the allegation that Hoover's secret files kept presidents from firing him "is a myth." However, Richard Nixon was recorded in 1971 as stating that one of the reasons he would not fire Hoover was that he was afraid of Hoover's reprisals against him. Similarly, Presidents Harry Truman and John F. Kennedy considered dismissing Hoover as FBI Director, but ultimately concluded that the political cost of doing so would be too great. In 1964, Hoover's FBI investigated Jack Valenti, a special assistant and confidant of President Lyndon Johnson, married to Johnson's personal secretary, but allegedly maintained gay relationship with a commercial photographer friend.

Hoover personally directed the FBI investigation of the assassination of President John F. Kennedy. In 1964, just days before Hoover testified in the earliest stages of the Warren Commission hearings, President Lyndon B. Johnson waived the then-mandatory U.S. Government Service Retirement Age of 70, allowing Hoover to remain the FBI Director "for an indefinite period of time". The House Select Committee on Assassinations issued a report in 1979 critical of the performance by the FBI, the Warren Commission, and other agencies. The report criticized the FBI's (Hoover's) reluctance to investigate thoroughly the possibility of a conspiracy to assassinate the President.

When Richard Nixon took office in January 1969, Hoover had just turned 74. There was a growing sentiment in Washington, D.C., that the aging FBI chief should retire, but Hoover's power and friends in Congress remained too strong for him to be forced to do so.

Hoover remained director of the FBI until he died of a heart attack in his Washington home, on May 2, 1972, whereupon operational command of the Bureau was passed onto Associate Director Clyde Tolson. On May 3, 1972, Nixon appointed L. Patrick Gray – a Justice Department official with no FBI experience – as Acting Director of the FBI, with W. Mark Felt becoming associate director.

Hoover's body lay in state in the Rotunda of the U.S. Capitol, where Chief Justice Warren Burger eulogized him. Up to that time, Hoover was the only civil servant to have lain in state, according to The New York Daily News. At the time, The New York Times observed that this was "an honor accorded to only 21 persons before, of whom eight were Presidents or former Presidents." (The Architect of the Capitol website provides a list of all those so honored, including Capitol Police killed in the line of duty in 1998 and 2021.) President Nixon delivered another eulogy at the funeral service in the National Presbyterian Church, and called Hoover "one of the Giants, [whose] long life brimmed over with magnificent achievement and dedicated service to this country which he loved so well". Hoover was buried in the Congressional Cemetery in Washington, D.C., next to the graves of his parents and a sister who had died in infancy.

Legacy

Biographer Kenneth D. Ackerman summarizes Hoover's legacy thus:For better or worse, he built the FBI into a modern, national organization stressing professionalism and scientific crime-fighting. For most of his life, Americans considered him a hero. He made the G-Man brand so popular that, at its height, it was harder to become an FBI agent than to be accepted into an Ivy League college.

Hoover worked to groom the image of the FBI in American media; he was a consultant to Warner Brothers for a theatrical film about the FBI, The FBI Story (1959), and in 1965 on Warner's long-running spin-off television series, The F.B.I. Hoover personally made sure Warner Brothers portrayed the FBI more favorably than other crime dramas of the times.

U.S. President Harry S Truman said that Hoover transformed the FBI into his private secret police force:
... we want no Gestapo or secret police. The FBI is tending in that direction. They are dabbling in sex-life scandals and plain blackmail. J. Edgar Hoover would give his right eye to take over, and all congressmen and senators are afraid of him.

Because Hoover's actions came to be seen as abuses of power, FBI directors are now limited to one 10-year term, subject to extension by the United States Senate.

Jacob Heilbrunn, journalist and senior editor at The National Interest gives a mixed assessment of Hoover's legacy:

The FBI Headquarters in Washington, D.C. is named the J. Edgar Hoover Building, after Hoover. Because of the controversial nature of Hoover's legacy, both Republicans and Democrats have periodically introduced legislation in the House and Senate to rename it. The first such proposal came just two months after the building's inauguration. On December 12, 1979, Gilbert Gude – a Republican congressman from Maryland – introduced H.R. 11137, which would have changed the name of the edifice from the "J. Edgar Hoover F.B.I. Building" to simply the "F.B.I. Building." However, that bill never made it out of committee, nor did two subsequent attempts by Gude. Another notable attempt came in 1993 when Democratic Senator Howard Metzenbaum pushed for a name change following a new report about Hoover's ordered "loyalty investigation" of future Senator Quentin Burdick. In 1998, Democratic Senator Harry Reid sponsored an amendment to strip Hoover's name from the building, stating that "J. Edgar Hoover's name on the FBI building is a stain on the building." The Senate did not adopt the amendment. The building is "aging" and "deteriorating" and its naming might eventually be made moot by the FBI moving its headquarters to a new suburban site.

Hoover's practice of violating civil liberties for the stated sake of national security has been questioned in reference to recent national surveillance programs. An example is a lecture titled Civil Liberties and National Security: Did Hoover Get it Right?, given at The Institute of World Politics on April 21, 2015.

Private life

Pets
Hoover received his first dog from his parents when he was a child, after which he was never without one. He owned many throughout his lifetime and became an aficionado especially knowledgeable in breeding of pedigrees, particularly Cairn Terriers and Beagles. He gave many dogs to notable people, such as Presidents Herbert Hoover (no relation) and Lyndon B. Johnson, and buried seven canine pets, including a Cairn Terrier named Spee De Bozo, at Aspen Hill Memorial Park, in Silver Spring, Maryland.

Sexuality

From the 1940s, rumors circulated that Hoover, who was still living with his mother in his early 40s, was homosexual. The historians John Stuart Cox and Athan G. Theoharis speculated that Clyde Tolson, who became an assistant director to Hoover in his mid 40s and became his primary heir, was a lover to Hoover until his death. Hoover reportedly hunted down and threatened anyone who made insinuations about his sexuality. Truman Capote, who enjoyed repeating salacious rumors about Hoover, once remarked that he was more interested in making Hoover angry than determining whether the rumors were true. On May 2, 1969, Screw published the first reference in print to J. Edgar Hoover's sexuality, titled "Is J. Edgar Hoover a Fag?"

Some associates and scholars dismiss rumors about Hoover's sexuality, and rumors about his relationship with Tolson in particular, as unlikely, while others have described them as probable or even "confirmed". Still other scholars have reported the rumors without expressing an opinion.

Cox and Theoharis concluded that "the strange likelihood is that Hoover never knew sexual desire at all." Anthony Summers, who wrote Official and Confidential: The Secret Life of J. Edgar Hoover (1993), stated that there was no ambiguity about the FBI director's sexual proclivities and described him as "bisexual with failed heterosexuality."

Hoover and Tolson

Hoover described Tolson as his alter ego: the men worked closely together during the day and, both single, frequently took meals, went to night clubs, and vacationed together. This closeness between the two men is often cited as evidence that they were lovers. Some FBI employees who knew them, such as Mark Felt, say the relationship was "brotherly"; however, former FBI executive assistant director Mike Mason suggested that some of Hoover's colleagues denied that he had a sexual relationship with Tolson in an effort to protect Hoover's image.

The novelist William Styron told Summers that he once saw Hoover and Tolson in a California beach house, where the director was painting his friend's toenails. Harry Hay, founder of the Mattachine Society, one of the first gay rights organizations, said Hoover and Tolson sat in boxes owned by and used exclusively by gay men at the Del Mar racetrack in California.

Hoover bequeathed his estate to Tolson, who moved into Hoover's house after Hoover died. Tolson accepted the American flag that draped Hoover's casket. Tolson is buried a few yards away from Hoover in the Congressional Cemetery.

Other romantic allegations
One of Hoover's biographers, Richard Hack, does not believe the director was gay. Hack notes that Hoover was romantically linked to actress Dorothy Lamour in the late 1930s and early 1940s and that after Hoover's death, Lamour did not deny rumors that she had had an affair with him.

Hack further reported that, during the 1940s and 1950s, Hoover attended social events with Lela Rogers, the divorced mother of dancer and actress Ginger Rogers, so often that many of their mutual friends assumed the pair would eventually marry.

Pornography for blackmail
Hoover kept a large collection of pornographic material, possibly the world's largest, of films, photographs, and written materials, with particular emphasis on nude photos of celebrities. He reportedly used these for his own titillation and held them for blackmail purposes.

Cross-dressing story
Lewis Rosenstiel, founder of Schenley Industries, was a close friend of Hoover's and the primary contributor to the J. Edgar Hoover Foundation. In his biography Official and Confidential: The Secret Life of J. Edgar Hoover (1993), journalist Anthony Summers quoted Rosenstiel's fourth wife, Susan, as claiming to have seen Hoover engaging in cross-dressing in the 1950s at all-male parties at the Plaza Hotel with her husband, attorney Roy Cohn, and young male prostitutes.
Another Hoover biographer, Burton Hersh, later corroborated this story.

Summers alleged the Mafia had blackmail material on Hoover, which made Hoover reluctant to pursue organized crime aggressively. According to Summers, organized crime figures Meyer Lansky and Frank Costello obtained photos of Hoover's alleged homosexual activity with Tolson and used them to ensure that the FBI did not target their illegal activities. Additionally, Summers claimed that Hoover was friends with Billy Byars Jr., an alleged child pornographer and producer of the film The Genesis Children. 

Another Hoover biographer who heard the rumors of homosexuality and blackmail, however, said he was unable to corroborate them, though it has been acknowledged that Lansky and other organized crime figures had frequently been allowed to visit the Del Charro Hotel in La Jolla, California, which was owned by Hoover's friend, and staunch Lyndon Johnson supporter, Clint Murchison Sr. Hoover and Tolson also frequently visited the Del Charro Hotel. Summers quoted a source named Charles Krebs as saying, "on three occasions that I knew about, maybe four, boys were driven down to La Jolla at Hoover's request."

Skeptics of the cross-dressing story point to Susan Rosenstiel's lack of credibility (she pleaded guilty to attempted perjury in a 1971 case and later served time in a New York City jail). Recklessly indiscreet behavior by Hoover would have been totally out of character, whatever his sexuality. Most biographers consider the story of Mafia blackmail unlikely in light of the FBI's continuing investigations of the Mafia.
Although never corroborated, the allegation of cross-dressing has been widely repeated. In the words of author Thomas Doherty, "For American popular culture, the image of the zaftig FBI director as a Christine Jorgensen wanna-be was too delicious not to savor." Biographer Kenneth Ackerman says that Summers' accusations have been "widely debunked by historians".

The journalist Liz Smith wrote that Cohn told her about Hoover's rumored transvestism "long before it became common gossip."

Lavender Scare

The attorney Roy Cohn served as general counsel on the Senate Permanent Subcommittee on Investigations during Senator Joseph McCarthy's tenure as chairman and assisted Hoover during the 1950s investigations of Communists and was generally known to be a closeted homosexual. According to Richard Hack, Cohn's opinion was that Hoover was too frightened of his own sexuality to have anything approaching a normal sexual or romantic relationship. Gossip columnist Liz Smith claimed that Roy Cohn "was the source of all those delicious tales about Hoover in smart frocks. He told these tales while Hoover was alive and after he died in 1972, during the fall of Richard Nixon."
Some of Cohn's former clients, including Bill Bonanno, son of crime boss Joseph Bonanno, also cite photographs of Hoover in drag allegedly possessed by Cohn.

During the Lavender scare, Cohn and McCarthy further enhanced anti-Communist fervor by suggesting that Communists overseas had convinced several closeted homosexuals within the U.S. government to leak important government information in exchange for the assurance that their sexual identity would remain a secret. A federal investigation that followed convinced President Dwight D. Eisenhower to sign Executive Order 10450 on April 29, 1953, that barred homosexuals from obtaining jobs at the federal level.

In his 2004 study of the event, historian David K. Johnson attacked the speculations about Hoover's homosexuality as relying on "the kind of tactics Hoover and the security program he oversaw perfected: guilt by association, rumor, and unverified gossip." He views Rosenstiel as a liar who was paid for her story, whose "description of Hoover in drag engaging in sex with young blond boys in leather while desecrating the Bible is clearly a homophobic fantasy." He believes only those who have forgotten the virulence of the decades-long campaign against homosexuals in government can believe reports that Hoover appeared in compromising situations.

Supportive friends
Some people associated with Hoover have supported the rumors about his homosexuality. According to Anthony Summers, Hoover often frequented New York City's Stork Club. Luisa Stuart, a model who was 18 or 19 at the time, told Summers that she had seen Hoover holding hands with Tolson as they all rode in a limo uptown to the Cotton Club in 1936.

Actress and singer Ethel Merman was a friend of Hoover's since 1938, and familiar with all parties during his alleged romance of Lela Rogers. In a 1978 interview and in response to Anita Bryant's anti-gay campaign, she said: "Some of my best friends are homosexual: Everybody knew about J. Edgar Hoover, but he was the best chief the FBI ever had."

Written works
J. Edgar Hoover was the nominal author of a number of books and articles, although it is widely believed that all of these were ghostwritten by FBI employees. Hoover received the credit and royalties.

Honors
1938: Oklahoma Baptist University awarded Hoover an honorary doctorate during commencement exercises, at which he spoke.
1939: the National Academy of Sciences awarded Hoover its Public Welfare Medal.
1950: King George VI of the United Kingdom appoints Hoover Honorary Knight Commander of the Order of the British Empire.
1955: President Dwight D. Eisenhower awarded Hoover the National Security Medal.
1966: President Lyndon B. Johnson bestowed the State Department's Distinguished Service Award on Hoover for his service as director of the FBI.
1973: The newly built FBI headquarters in Washington, D.C., was named the J. Edgar Hoover Building.
1974: Congress voted to honor Hoover's memory by publishing a memorial book, J. Edgar Hoover: Memorial Tributes in the Congress of the United States and Various Articles and Editorials Relating to His Life and Work.
1974: In Schaumburg, Illinois, a grade school was named after J. Edgar Hoover. However, in 1994, after information about Hoover's illegal activities was released, the school's name was changed to commemorate Herbert Hoover instead.

Theater and media portrayals

J. Edgar Hoover has been portrayed by numerous actors in films and stage productions featuring him as FBI Director. The first known portrayal was by Kent Rogers in the 1941 Looney Tunes short "Hollywood Steps Out". Some notable portrayals (listed chronologically) include:
 Hoover portrayed himself (filmed from behind) in a cameo, addressing FBI agents in the 1959 film The FBI Story.
 Dorothi Fox "portrayed" Hoover in disguise in the 1971 film Bananas.
 Broderick Crawford and James Wainwright in the Larry Cohen film The Private Files of J. Edgar Hoover (1977).
 Dolph Sweet in the television miniseries King (1978).
 Sheldon Leonard in the William Friedkin film The Brink's Job (1978).
 Ernest Borgnine in the television film Blood Feud (1983).
 Vincent Gardenia in the television miniseries Kennedy (1983).
 Jack Warden in the television film Hoover vs. The Kennedys (1987).
 Treat Williams in the television film J. Edgar Hoover (1987).
 Kevin Dunn in the film Chaplin (1992).
 Pat Hingle in the television film Citizen Cohn (1992).
 Richard Dysart in the television film Marilyn & Bobby: Her Final Affair (1993)
 Kelsey Grammer portrayed Hoover, with John Goodman as Tolson, in the Harry Shearer comic musical J. Edgar! at The Guest Quarters Suite Hotel in Santa Monica (1994).
 Richard Dysart in the theatrical film Panther (1995).
 Bob Hoskins in the Oliver Stone drama Nixon (1995).
 Wayne Tippit in two episodes of Dark Skies (1996) and (1997).
 David Fredericks in the episodes "Musings of a Cigarette Smoking Man" (1996) and "Travelers" (1998) of The X-Files.
 David Fredericks in the episode "Matryoshka" (1999) of Millennium.
 Ernest Borgnine in the theatrical film Hoover (2000).
 Larry Drake in the Robert Dyke film Timequest (2002).
 Ryan Drummond voiced him in the Bethesda Softworks game Call of Cthulhu: Dark Corners of the Earth (2005).
 Billy Crudup in the Michael Mann film Public Enemies (2009).
 Enrico Colantoni in the television miniseries The Kennedys (2011).
 Leonardo DiCaprio in the Clint Eastwood biopic J. Edgar (2011).
 William Harrison-Wallace in the Dollar Baby 2012 screen adaptation of Stephen King's short story, "The Death of Jack Hamilton" (2001).
 Rob Riggle in the "Atlanta" (2013) episode of Comedy Central's Drunk History.
 Eric Ladin in the HBO series Boardwalk Empire, season 4 (2013).
 Michael McKean in Robert Schenkkan's play All the Way at the American Repertory Theater (2013).
 Sean McNall in the movie No God, No Master (2014).
 Dylan Baker in Ava DuVernay's Martin Luther King Jr. biopic Selma (2014).
 Stephen Root in the HBO television film All the Way (2016).
 T. R. Knight in the National Geographic television series Genius (2017).
 William Forsythe in the Amazon television series The Man in the High Castle (2018).
 Stephen Stanton in the film Bad Times at the El Royale (2018)
 Martin Sheen in the film Judas and the Black Messiah (2021).
 Giacomo Baessato in the CW television series Legends of Tomorrow (2021).

See also

Deep state in the United States
G-Man
Harry J. Anslinger
Helen Gandy
McCarthyism

References

Citations

General and cited references 

  – Total pages: 848 

"The Secret File on J. Edgar Hoover". Frontline episode #11.4 (1993).

Further reading

 Caballero, Raymond. McCarthyism vs. Clinton Jencks. Norman: University of Oklahoma Press, 2019.
 Cecil, Matthew (2016). Branding Hoover's FBI: How the Boss's PR Men Sold the Bureau to America. Lawrence, KS: University Press of Kansas, 2016.

External links

|-

1895 births
1972 deaths
People from Capitol Hill, DC
Lawyers from Washington, D.C.
Directors of the Federal Bureau of Investigation
American anti-communists
American Freemasons
American librarians
American people of English descent
American people of German descent
American people of Swiss-German descent
American Presbyterians
Anti-crime activists
Washington, D.C., Independents
Freemasonry-related controversies
Burials at the Congressional Cemetery
George Washington University Law School alumni
George Washington University trustees
Honorary Knights Commander of the Order of the British Empire
Articles containing video clips